The  Cape rock thrush (Monticola rupestris) is a member of the bird family Muscicapidae. This rock thrush breeds in eastern and southern South Africa, Lesotho and Eswatini. It is a common endemic resident, non-migratory apart from seasonal altitudinal movements in some areas.

This species breeds in mountainous rocky areas with scattered vegetation. It lays 2-3 eggs in a cup nest in a rock cavity or on a ledge. It eats a wide range of insects and other small animals, and some berries.

This is a large stocky rock thrush  in length. The summer male has a blue-grey head, orange underparts and outer tail feathers, and brown wings and back.

Females have a brown head, but their underparts are a much richer orange than those of other female rock thrushes. The outer tail feathers are reddish, like the male's. Immatures are like the female, but the upperparts have buff spots and the underparts show black scaling.

The male Cape rock thrush has a whistled song , and occasionally mimics other birds.

References

 Clement and Hathaway, Thrushes 
 Sinclair, Hockey and Tarboton, SASOL Birds of Southern Africa,

External links
 Cape rock thrush - Species text in The Atlas of Southern African Birds.

Cape rock thrush
Birds of Southern Africa
Cape rock thrush
Cape rock thrush